Johnston Hall may refer to:

in Canada
 Johnston Hall (University of Guelph), a historical residence building at the University of Guelph, Ontario

in the United States
 Johnston Hall-Seabury Divinity School, Faribault, Minnesota, listed on the National Register of Historic Places (NRHP)
 Johnston Hall (University of Missouri), a historic University of Missouri dormitory
 Johnston Hall (Elon College, North Carolina), listed on the NRHP
 Johnston Hall (Milwaukee, Wisconsin), listed on the NRHP
 Johnston Hall (Moravian College), Bethlehem, Pennsylvania

Architectural disambiguation pages